Primarily Jazz is an album (LP Vinyl) released by the Fullerton College Jazz Band for the Discovery Records Trend AM-PM label, it was the third release in as many years.

Background 
In 1981 the Music Department at Fullerton College built a 16 track in house recording facility which was to serve as a teaching tool for both student music groups and students wanting to take recording technology classes at a vocational level.  Primarily Jazz is the third of many albums to come out of this studio to feature the award-winning Fullerton College Jazz Band.  The LP does contain tracks from three of the Fullerton College jazz groups: Jazz Band I, Jazz Band II, Connection Jazz Combo.

The distinctive qualities about the LP that set it apart from numerous college jazz records (what people think of as promotional demos) is the fact it was a two-year community college able to get on a label so quickly.  Albert Marx, who was the owner of Discovery Records/Trend Records AM-PM label, became very impressed with the band and the level of the music coming from the jazz groups at Fullerton College. He decided to support the younger, up and coming jazz students/players from the greater Los Angeles/Southern California region by producing certain LPs.

The roster on this album is self-evident as to the diversity and level of student musicians Fullerton College developed at that time and has for many years. The track The Bop Brothers Beach Party track is also featured on the 1998 CD Celebration - The Fullerton College Jazz Festival 25th Anniversary.

Track listing

Recording Sessions 

 recorded January 25–27, 1984, Fullerton College, Fullerton, California

Personnel

Musicians 
Conductors: Terry Blackley and James Linahon
Piano/tenor sax (guest soloist): Tom Ranier
Alto sax (guest soloist): Ernie Del Fante
Trumpet (guest soloist): James Linahon
Trombone (guest soloist): Jeff Tower
Drums (guest soloist): Allen Carter
Saxes and woodwinds: Steve Alaniz, Jack Cooper, Phil Walker, Tony Morris, Edmund Velasco, Laura Nixon, Jeff Rupert, Steve Page, Luis Segovia, Russell Burt, Dan Friedman, Todd Senn
Trumpets and flugelhorns: Phillip Wightman, Mike Schwartz, Jim Watkins, Tim Grindheim, Mark Hudson, John Aranda, Johnny Nosky, Jeff Collins
Trombones:  Roger Olsen, Wendell Kelly, Dave Abgego,  Bob Heller, Dale Sanders, Dave Aul, John Gilberson, Thomas Poff, Mark Titzkowski
Guitar: Bruce Woll, Dave Bastien
Piano: Phill Bastanchury, Barbara Farkas
Bass: Tim Givens, Denise Briese, Carol Chapin
Drums: Dave Hitchings, Pat Ready, David Ramirez, Cheryl Savala
Percussion: Tim Holloway

Production 
Recording engineers: James Linahon
Second recording engineer: Randy Beers
Mixing engineers: Terry Blackley and James Linahon.
Mastering: Bernie Grundman
Pressing: L.R.S. Inc.
Photography: Dick Rupert, John Shideler, Terry Blackley
Liner notes: Terry Blackley
Album design: Graham Booth, Fullerton College Art Department

Reception

References

External links

 

 Official website

1984 albums
Fullerton College Jazz Band albums